The 2011–12 I liga was the 64th season of the second tier domestic division in the Polish football league system since its establishment in 1949 and the 4th season of the Polish I liga under its current title. The league was operated by the Polish Football Association (PZPN).

The league is contested by 18 teams who competing for promotion to the 2012–13 Ekstraklasa. The regular season was played in a round-robin tournament. The champions and runners-up would receive promotion. The bottom four teams were automatically demoted to the II liga.

Changes from last season

From I liga
Promoted to 2010–11 Ekstraklasa
ŁKS Łódź
Podbeskidzie Bielsko-Biała
Relegated
MKS Kluczbork (to II liga, Group West)
KSZO Ostrowiec Świętokrzyski (to II liga, Group East)
Odra Wodzisław Śląski (disbanded)
GKP Gorzów Wielkopolski (disbanded)

To I liga
Relegated from 2010–11 Ekstraklasa
Arka Gdynia
Polonia Bytom
Promoted from II liga, Group East
Olimpia Elbląg
Wisła Płock
Promoted from II liga, Group West
Olimpia Grudziądz
Zawisza Bydgoszcz

Team overview

Stadiums and locations

 Piast played 2 home games at Stadion Miejski in Wodzisław Śląski (cap. 7,000
 Warta played 3 home games at Stadion im. Edmunda Szyca (cap. 4,000)

Personnel and sponsoring

 Kolejarz displays the charity's logo on their kit.

Managerial changes

League table

Results

Statistics

Top goalscorers

Hat-tricks

Scoring
 First goal of the season: Dariusz Pawlusiński for Termalica against GKS Katowice (22 July 2011)
 Fastest goal of the season: 24 seconds – Wojciech Kędziora for Piast Gliwice against Termalica (13 April 2012)
 Most goals in a game: 8 goals
Radzionków 4–4 Polkowice (20 May 2012)
 Most goals scored in a game by one team: 6 goals
Wisła 6–1 Sandecja (12 November 2011)
Most goals scored in a match by a losing team: 3 goals
Zawisza 4–3 Olimpia G. (18 March 2012)
Elbląg 3–4 Polkowice (4 May 2012)
 Largest winning margin: 5 goals
Katowice 5–0 Polkowice (14 September 2011)
Wisła 6–1 Sandecja (12 November 2011)
 Widest away winning margin: 4 goals
Flota 0–4 Sandecja (9 May 2012)
 Highest scoring draw: 8 goals
Radzionków 4–4 Polkowice
 Most games failed to score in: 17
GKS Katowice
 Fewest games failed to score in: 5
Pogoń Szczecin

Disciplinary record by team

Source:

 Most yellow cards (player): 12 – Arkadiusz Baran (Termalica Bruk-Bet Nieciecza), Błażej Jankowski (Zawisza Bydgoszcz)
 Most red cards (player): 2 – Radosław Bartoszewicz (GKS Bogdanka), Jan Buryán (Piast Gliwice), Janusz Dziedzic (Olimpia Grudziądz), Cheikh Niane (Kolejarz Stróże), Marcin Nowak (KS Polkowice), Grzegorz Piesio (Dolcan Ząbki), Michał Renusz (GKS Bogdanka), Dawid Szufryn (Kolejarz Stróże), Wojciech Wilczyński (Arka Gdynia, Polonia Bytom)

Clean sheets
 Most clean sheets: 17
Termalica Bruk-Bet Nieciecza
 Fewest clean sheets: 3
KS Polkowice

References

Pol
2011–12 in Polish football
I liga seasons